Steve Howard is a Canadian politician, who was elected to the Legislative Assembly of Prince Edward Island in the 2019 Prince Edward Island general election. He represents the district of Summerside-South Drive as a member of the Green Party of Prince Edward Island and is the shadow critic for energy & transportation. He previously worked for Renewable Lifestyles Ltd.

Election results

References 

Living people
People from Summerside, Prince Edward Island
Green Party of Prince Edward Island MLAs
21st-century Canadian politicians
Year of birth missing (living people)